Beka is a small settlement in the Municipality of Hrpelje-Kozina in the Littoral region of Slovenia on the border with Italy.

The local church is dedicated to Saint Lawrence and belongs to the parish of Klanec.

References

External links
Beka on Geopedia

Populated places in the Municipality of Hrpelje-Kozina